La Chapelle-Blanche (literally The White Chapel) is a commune in the Savoie department in the Auvergne-Rhône-Alpes region in south-eastern France. The village is located in the Combe de Savoie, on the southwestern slope of the hill Montraillant.

History
The town of La Chapelle-Blanche historically belongs to the French Dauphiné province. It was ceded to the Duchy of Savoy on 24 March 1760 by the Convention of Turin.

The parish was joined to the parish of Villaroux from 1803 to 1825.

The Savoy region, which included La Chapelle-Blanche, was annexed by France in 1860 following a plebiscite.

Notable people
 Amélie Gex, (1835-1883), writer, noted for her works of poetry and prose in the Franco-Provençal (Arpitan) language.  Note: A monument honoring Amélie Gex stands in the town.
 Louis Edmond Seraphin Charvet (1901-1987); industrialist; CEO of Air France; mayor of La Chapelle-Blanche in 1959; poet known by the pseudonym "Evrard of Millières"; and creator of the La Chapelle-Blanche Theatre Festival.

See also
 Communes of the Savoie department

References

External links

 La Chapelle-Blanche at IGN (Institut géographique national)

Communes of Savoie